Archaeomenia is a genus of neomeniamorph solenogaster, a kind of shell-less, worm-like mollusk.

References

Neomeniamorpha